is a 2018 Japanese animated romance film directed by Seimei Kidokoro, written by Kazuhiro Furuhashi, produced by Nippon Animation, and distributed by Warner Bros. Japan. The film was released in Japan on October 19, 2018.

Based on a manga series with a same name written and illustrated by Waki Yamato, the film covers the latter half of the story from the manga, and picks up where Part 1 had left off in 2017.

Plot
After marrying the head of the military, Benio hears her husband died in Siberia during a war. However, after finding out he's alive and fighting against his home land, Benio starts looking for her first love. Wondering why he didn't return and wanting to welcome him back. Hardships will happen and hearts may be broken, as he might have moved on.

Voice cast

Production
It was first announced in November 2016 that an animated film adaptation of Haikara-San: Here Comes Miss Modern written and illustrated by Waki Yamato will be produced as a two-part film. Staff members from Part 1 returned: Kazuhiro Furuhashi writing the screenplay, Terumi Nishii in charge of the character design, and Michiru Ōshima composing the music. Mitsuko Kase was set to direct the second film, but later was replaced by Seimei Kidokoro for unknown reasons. In July 2018, voice actress and singer Maaya Sakamoto joined the cast for the film as Larissa.

Release
The film was released in theaters in Japan on October 19, 2018. Eleven Arts screened the film in the U.S. on December 17, 2018.

References

External links
 

2018 anime films
2018 films
Japanese animated films
2010s Japanese-language films
Manga adapted into films
Films scored by Michiru Ōshima

ja:はいからさんが通る#劇場アニメ